Morgan Marc Boyes (born 22 April 2001) is a Welsh footballer who plays as a defender for Scottish Premiership club Livingston.

Early life
Boyes was born in the Welsh city of St Asaph and moved to Chester in England at the age of five.

Club career
Boyes made his professional debut for Liverpool on 17 December 2019, starting in the away match against Aston Villa in the quarter-finals of the EFL Cup, which finished as a 5–0 loss. He scored an own goal in the match, after blocking a ball from Ahmed Elmohamady, to find it looped over the goalkeeper's head into the corner of the net. Boyes made another appearance for Liverpool in the 2019–20 season, as he appeared in stoppage time against Shrewsbury Town in the fourth round replay of the FA Cup.

On 12 August 2020, Boyes joined League One side Fleetwood Town on a season-long loan. On 23 September, he made his debut for the Cod Army. Starting at left centre-back in a EFL Cup Third round tie against Everton. He played the full match in a 2–5 defeat. He made kept his place in the squad for the next game. A 0–1 defeat against AFC Wimbledon in the League One. However, he would only make two more appearances before being recalled by Liverpool on 2 January 2021.

On 4 January 2022, Boyes joined Scottish Premiership side Livingston on an 18-month contract, with an option of a further year.

International career
Boyes has Wales caps at both under-19 and under-21 levels. In March 2021, he was called up to the Wales national under-21 football team, playing all 90 minutes in Wales's 2–1 defeat by Ireland at Colliers Park, Wrexham on 26 March 2021. Manager Paul Bodin then selected a largely unchanged squad, including Boyes, for the side's Euro 2023 qualifying game against Moldova on 4 June 2021.

Style of play
Boyes is a centre-back but has also been deployed as a left back so far during his career. He has described himself as a "calm defender who likes to play and build up from the back.". Joey Barton, who managed Boyes during his loan spell at Fleetwood, described him as "a young player with plenty of potential".

Career statistics

Club

Honours
Liverpool
 FA Youth Cup: 2018–19

References

External links
 
 
 
 

2001 births
Living people
Sportspeople from St Asaph
Welsh footballers
Wales youth international footballers
Wales under-21 international footballers
Association football defenders
Liverpool F.C. players
Fleetwood Town F.C. players
English Football League players
Livingston F.C. players